Tak (Burmese: တာ့ခ် pronounced [tak]) is one of Thailand's seventy-seven provinces (changwat) and lies in lower northern Thailand. Neighbouring provinces are (from north clockwise) Mae Hong Son, Chiang Mai, Lamphun, Lampang, Sukhothai, Kamphaeng Phet, Nakhon Sawan, Uthai Thani and Kanchanaburi. The western edge of the province has a long boundary with Kayin State of Myanmar (Burma).

Geography

The Bhumibol Dam (named after King Bhumibol Adulyadej, the old name was Yanhee Dam) is in Khao Kaew Tambon (sub-district), Sam Ngao District of Tak and was built from 1958 to 1964. It stops the river Ping, one of the two sources of the Chao Phraya River. The artificial lake created covers an area of 300 km2 and is the largest in Thailand. Taksin Maharat National Park, Namtok Pha Charoen National Park, Lan Sang National Park, and Khun Phawo National Parks are all in the province. Thungyai Naresuan Wildlife Sanctuary shares half of the lake front with Kanchanaburi and Huai Kha Khaeng Wildlife Sanctuary at the border with Uthai Thani and are World Heritage Sites.

On the western side of Tak province the Tenasserim Hills meet the Dawna Range. One of the few transnational roads and cross-border points into Myanmar is at Mae Sot. Northwest of Mae Sot the main road on the Thai side skirts the border until it turns straight north towards Mae Hong Son.

Tak province occupies  and lies 426 km north of Bangkok.

National parks
Four national parks and two national parks (preparation), along with two other national parks, make up region 14 (Tak) of Thailand's protected areas.
 Namtok Pha Charoen National Park, 
  Khun Phawo National Park, 
 Doi Soi Malai National Park, 
 Mae Moei National Park, 
 Taksin Maharat National Park, 
 Lan Sang National Park,

Wildlife sanctuary
There area a total of five wildlife sanctuaries, four of which are in region 14 (Tak), but Tham Chao Ram is not in Tak province and Omkoi is in region 16 (Chiang Mai) of Thailand's protected areas.
 Umphang Wildlife Sanctuary, 
 Thung Yai Naresuan East Wildlife Sanctuary, 
 Omkoi Wildlife Sanctuary, 
 Mae Tuen Wildlife Sanctuary,

History
Tak was a historical kingdom built over 2,000 years ago, even before the Sukhothai period. The ancient kingdom had its peak around the 1st century. By the 5th century the capital of this kingdom was moved south to Lavo (present day Lopburi province). A city named Ban Tak was established by Jamadevi (พระนางจามเทวี), princess of the Lavo kingdom, around 663 CE. It became part of the Sukhothai kingdom through battles led by Ramkhamhaeng the Great and formed the main fortress on the western front. The city was moved further west and renamed Mueang Rahang when the Ayuthaya kingdom was lost to Burma during King Maha Thammaracha's reign. The city was moved back to the east side of the Ping River during the early Bangkok period.

King Taksin was vice-governor of Tak before the Ayutthaya kingdom fell during the war with Burma. As his name was Sin, he became called Tak-Sin during his time in Tak.

Demographics
About a quarter of the population belongs to one of Thailand's hill tribes: Yao, Karen (Thai Kariang), Akha (Thai Akha), Lahu (Thai Musoe), Hmong (Thai Mong), and Lisu (Thai Lisaw). The largest tribe in Tak is Karen.

Refugees
According to the UNHCR data of 2008, nearly 95,000 of Thailand's 121,000 registered refugees from Burma are housed in several refugee camps in Tak province of which Mae La camp is the largest with around 45,000 Karen refugees.

Administrative divisions

Provincial government
The province is divided into nine districts (amphoes). These are further divided into 63 subdistricts (tambons) and 493 villages (mubans).

Local government
As of 26 November 2019 there are: one Tak Provincial Administration Organisation and 19 municipal (thesaban) areas in the province. Mae Sot has city (thesaban nakhon) status. Tak has town (thesaban mueang) status. Further 17 subdistrict municipalities (thesaban tambon). The non-municipal areas are administered by 49 Subdistrict Administrative Organisations - SAO (ongkan borihan suan tambon).

Symbols
The provincial seal shows King Naresuan on the royal elephant. Sometimes below the elephant a garuda is depicted, as the garuda is the state symbol of Thailand. King Naresuan is shown pouring consecrated water on the ground, a symbolic act to declare independence. This refers to the war of 1584 with Burma, when Tak was the first border town to be liberated from Burmese control.

The provincial slogan is, "A town of wonderful nature, huge Bhumiphol Dam, King Taksin The Great and beautiful forests".

The provincial tree is the Asian Jatoba (Xylia xylocarpa var. kerrii), and the provincial flower is the Orchid tree (Bauhinia sp.).

Health 
There are two main public hospitals in Tak: Somdejphrajaotaksin Maharaj Hospital and Mae Sot Hospital, both operated by the Ministry of Public Health.

Economy

Agriculture is a major part of the Tak economy. The province of Tak produces rice, corn, vegetables, fruits, beef, tilapia, and other foods. Industries in Tak include granite quarrying and jewelry. Zinc mining was formerly conducted in Mae Sot District.

Handicrafts and Myanmar products are also important for trade. The Bhumibol Dam in the northern part of Tak is its most popular tourist attraction. Tourism, especially ecotourism, in the southern part is seasonal with popular destinations such as the Thi Lo Su Waterfall, Thi Lo Le Waterfall, hiking and white water rafting in its various forest reserves. Tak is also known for its Loi Krathong festival where krathong sai (กระทงสาย) consisting of many krathongs are floated in a long line down the river. The Loi Krathong festival is held on the Ping River in Mueang Tak District on Loi Krathong night.

Transportation

Roads
Tak is a key communication and transportation centre of the north, with three Asian highways passing through the province. AH1 enters through the Myanmar-Thai border at Mae Sot District AH2 passes through the province from north to south. Also AH16 terminates at Tak.

Air
Tak province is served by Tak Airport.

Human achievement index 2017

Since 2003, United Nations Development Programme (UNDP) in Thailand has tracked progress on human development at sub-national level using the Human achievement index (HAI), a composite index covering all the eight key areas of human development. National Economic and Social Development Board (NESDB) has taken over this task since 2017.

References

External links

Provincial website

 
Provinces of Thailand